Hercules and the Black Pirates (/ Samson Against the Black Pirate), also known as Hercules and the Pirates and Hercules and the Black Pirate, is a 1963 Italian pirate-peplum film directed  by Luigi Capuano and starring Alan Steel.

Plot

Cast
Alan Steel as   Hercules/ Samson 
 Rosalba Neri as Rosita 
 Piero Lulli as Rodrigo Sanchez 
 Andrea Aureli as The Black Corsair
 Elisa Mainardi as Carmelita 
 Nerio Bernardi as Governor of Hermosa 
  Cinzia Bruno as Alma 
 Nello Pazzafini as The Black Corsair's Henchman
 Enzo Maggio  
  Anna Arena  
 Ignazio Balsamo

References

External links

    
Italian adventure films
Peplum films 
Pirate films 
1960s adventure films   
Films directed by Luigi Capuano
Sword and sandal films
1960s Italian-language films
1960s Italian films